The Central District of Estahban County is a district (bakhsh) in Estahban County, Fars Province, Iran. At the 2006 census, its population was 43,582, in 11,141 families.  The District has two cities: Estahban and Ij. The District has one rural district (dehestan): Ij Rural District.

References 

Estahban County
Districts of Fars Province